More is a small village and civil parish in Shropshire, England.

It lies near the border with Wales and the nearest town is Bishop's Castle.

There is a parish church in the village. The civil parish extends greatly to the north of the village, encompassing a large tract of rural upland, and includes the community of Linley.

Nearby is the larger settlement of Lydham, which is outside the civil parish and on the A488 road.

See also
Listed buildings in More, Shropshire

References

Civil parishes in Shropshire
Villages in Shropshire